De rerum natura (usually translated as On the Nature of Things) is a philosophical epic poem written by Lucretius in Latin around 55 BCE. The poem was lost during the Middle Ages, rediscovered in 1417, and first printed in 1473. Its earliest published translation into any language (French) did not occur until 1650; in English — although earlier partial or unpublished translations exist — the first complete translation to be published was that of Thomas Creech, in heroic couplets, in 1682. Only a few more English translations appeared over the next two centuries, but in the 20th century translations began appearing more frequently.

Only complete (or nearly complete) translations are listed. Notable translations of individual passages include the "invocation to Venus" by Edmund Spenser in The Faerie Queene IV.X.44-47; and five passages in John Dryden's Sylvae (1685).

Key

 Year — The year of first publication (except where * indicates year of composition).
 Translator
 Publication — The name of the work as published; ISBNs and links to PDFs when available; other publication information.
 Source — Some translators refer to multiple Latin editions; only the primary Latin source text (if known) is noted here.
 Notes — "Prose" or the form of verse is always listed first, so that sorting on this column groups formally similar translations; other germane information follows.

Table

References

External links

 English verse translation by Lamberto Bozzi (2022) at Centro Risorse Territoriale di Pesaro e Urbino

Natural philosophy

Epic poems in Latin

Philosophy books
De rerum natura
Translation-related lists